Pier Angeli (19 June 193210 September 1971), also credited under her real name, Anna Maria Pierangeli, was an Italian-born film and television actress, singer and model, who starred in American, British and European films throughout her career. Her  American motion picture debut was in the starring role of the film Teresa (1951), for which she won a Golden Globe Award for Young Star of the Year - Actress. Besides this film, she is best remembered for her roles in, Domani è troppo tardi (1950), Somebody Up There Likes Me (1956) and The Angry Silence (1960).

Early life and career 
Born Anna Maria Pierangeli to Enrichetta (née Romiti) and Luigi Pierangeli in Cagliari, Sardinia, Italy. Her twin sister is the actress Marisa Pavan.

Angeli spent World War II in Rome; she was ten when the Nazis occupied Rome, experiencing both food shortages and bomb shelters. She was deeply affected by her experiences during the war, recalling later: "What was in the world, I didn't want to know."
Angeli made her film debut with Vittorio De Sica's Italian film, Domani è troppo tardi (1950) after being spotted by director Léonide Moguy and De Sica while studying Arts in Rome, at the age of sixteen. Her work was so impressive that she won an Italian award for Best Actress, and caught the eye of MGM producers, who offered her a contract with the studio. MGM launched her in Teresa (1951), her first American film, which also saw the film debuts of Rod Steiger and John Ericson. Reviews for this performance compared her to Greta Garbo, and she won the New Star of the Year–Actress Golden Globe. Under contract to MGM throughout the 1950s, she appeared in a series of films, including The Light Touch with Stewart Granger and The Devil Makes Three with Gene Kelly. Plans for a film of Romeo and Juliet with her and Marlon Brando fell through when a British-Italian production was announced. 

While filming The Story of Three Loves (1953), Angeli began a relationship with costar Kirk Douglas. She next appeared in Sombrero, in which she replaced an indisposed Ava Gardner, then Flame and the Flesh (1954). After discovering Leslie Caron, another European ingénue, MGM lent Angeli to other studios. She went to Warner Bros. for both The Silver Chalice (1954), which marked the debut of Paul Newman, and the French-language musical Oh No, Mam'zelle (Mam'zelle Nitouche), also 1954), co-starring alongside Fernandel. For Paramount, she was in contention for the role of Anna Magnani's daughter in The Rose Tattoo (1955), but the role went to Marisa Pavan, her twin sister. MGM lent her to Columbia for Port Afrique (1956), where she got to showcase her real singing voice. She returned to MGM for Somebody Up There Likes Me (1956) as Paul Newman's long-suffering wife (Angeli's former lover, James Dean, was to play the starring role, which went to Newman after Dean's death). Newman would later say of her: "The most beautiful Italian actress of the century. She was an extremely complex and gifted woman. It was so unfortunate that the roles she was asked to play rarely demanded what I know she had to offer." She then appeared in The Vintage (1957) and finished her MGM contract in Merry Andrew (1958) starring alongside Danny Kaye. She was in consideration to play the character of Rima in, Green Mansions (1959), a character she had long wanted to play. Instead she played the part for the July 1954 issue of Life Magazine, shot by Allan Grant.  In 1959, she released an album called Italia con Pier Angeli in which she sings in English and Italian. One reviewer called her singing voice "warm and surprisingly rich." She also continued to be hired for modelling jobs well into the 1960s.

During the 1960s and until 1970, Angeli lived and worked in Britain and Europe, and was often screen-credited under her birth name, Anna Maria Pierangeli. She starred in French, Italian and English-language movies throughout the 1960s. Her performance in The Angry Silence (1960), starring alongside her friend Richard Attenborough, was nominated for a Best Foreign Actress BAFTA, and she was reunited with Stewart Granger for Sodom and Gomorrah (1963), in which she played Lot's wife. She had a brief role in the war epic Battle of the Bulge (1965). Angeli worked in Israel, and was top-billed, for Every Bastard a King (1968), about events during the Arab-Israeli Six-Day War the previous year. She was under serious consideration for a part in, The Godfather (1972), but died before shooting began.

Personal life and death 
Angeli was fluent in Italian and English, and near fluent in French. She was good friends with Debbie Reynolds, Louis Jourdan, and Richard Attenborough. Because she travelled so much, she encountered many artists throughout her life. For example, In 1960, Angeli met Serge Gainsbourg in a nightclub. On a piece of paper she scribbled in French: "J’adore 'L’eau à la bouche', ça me donne l’eau à la bouche," and slipped it into one of Gainsbourg's pockets. He treasured this relic, and her gesture had the effect of motivating him to persevere in romantic songwriting.

According to Kirk Douglas' autobiography The Ragman's Son, he and Angeli were engaged in the 1950s after meeting on the set of the film The Story of Three Loves (1953). Angeli also had a passionate romantic relationship with James Dean. They met while she was shooting The Silver Chalice (1954) and he was shooting East of Eden (1955), on an adjoining Warner lot. Elia Kazan, the director of East of Eden (1955), remembered hearing Dean and Angeli loudly making love in Dean's dressing room. Much against her will, she was forced to break it off mainly because her mother was not happy with their relationship as Dean was not Catholic. There were rumors that she and Dean secretly saw each other up until his death; Joe Hyams, in his 1992 biography of Dean, James Dean: Little Boy Lost, claims that he visited Dean just as Angeli, then married to Damone, was leaving his home. An Order for the Solemnization of Marriage pamphlet with the name "Pier" lightly penciled in every place the bride's name is left blank was found amongst Dean's personal effects after his death. She would later say that he was the love of her life: "He is the only man I ever loved deeply as a woman should love a man." Friends of Angeli have said she never fully recovered from his death and that she had nightmares about him up until her own death.

Angeli was married to singer and actor Vic Damone from 1954 to 1958. Singer and actor Dean Martin performed at their wedding. It was reported by several people who attended the wedding that they saw James Dean, claiming Dean watched the wedding from across the road on his motorcycle, even gunning the engine during the ceremony, although Dean later denied doing anything so "dumb". During their marriage, they appeared as guests on the June 17, 1956 episode of What's My Line?. She had one son with Vic Damone; their divorce was followed by highly publicized court battles for the custody of their only child, son Perry (1955–2014).

Angeli next married Italian composer Armando Trovajoli in 1962 with whom she had another son, Howard, in 1963. She and Trovajoli separated in 1969.

In the early 1970s she returned to California, after having lived in Britain and Europe throughout the 1960s, and briefly lived with her close friend Debbie Reynolds until she found a little apartment in Beverly Hills. On September 10, 1971, at the age of 39, Angeli was found dead of a barbiturate overdose at her home in Beverly Hills. On the day of her death, Angeli had been given an injection of Compazine by her doctor to calm her down (she was unable to sleep and had run out of Doriden which the doctor refused to give her). Death due to anaphylaxis has been suggested; however, it is not supported by the findings of her autopsy. Her former lover Kirk Douglas and his wife Anne Buydens were among those who were invited to her funeral. She is interred in the Cimetière des Bulvis in Rueil-Malmaison, Hauts-de-Seine, France.

Portrayals in popular culture
Angeli was portrayed by Valentina Cervi in the 2001 TV movie James Dean, which depicted her relationship with Dean. In 2015, she was portrayed by Alessandra Mastronardi in the James Dean biopic Life. A fictional interpretation of her life can be found in the book, Anna-Maria Pier Angeli: Une Madone à Babylone.

Filmography

Discography
Italia con Pier Angeli (1959), Roulette, Vinyl.

Awards and nominations

References

External links 

 
 
 
 Pier Angeli Official Site
 Photographs and literature

1932 births
1971 deaths
Italian Roman Catholics
People from Cagliari
People of Marchesan descent
Drug-related deaths in California
Barbiturates-related deaths
Burials in Île-de-France
Italian expatriates in the United States
Italian film actresses
Italian television actresses
Metro-Goldwyn-Mayer contract players
Italian twins
Nastro d'Argento winners
New Star of the Year (Actress) Golden Globe winners
20th-century Italian actresses
Expatriate actresses in the United States
1971 suicides